Brick Lane (Bengali: ব্রিক লেন) is a street in the East End of London, in the borough of Tower Hamlets. It runs from Swanfield Street in Bethnal Green in the north,  crosses the Bethnal Green Road before reaching the busiest, most commercially active part which runs through Spitalfields, or along its eastern edge. Brick Lane’s southern end is connected to Whitechapel High Street by a short extension called Osborn Street.

Today, it is the heart of the country's Bangladeshi community with the vicinity known to some as Banglatown. It is famous for its many curry houses.

Early history

15th to 18th centuries
The street was formerly known as Whitechapel Lane, and wound through fields. It derives its current name from brick and tile manufacture started in the 15th century, which used the local brick earth deposits. The street featured in the 16th-century Woodcut map of London as a partially-developed crossroad leading north from the city's most easterly edge, and by the 17th century was being developed northwards from the Barres (now Whitechapel High Street) as a result of expanding population.

Brewing came to Brick Lane before 1680, with water drawn from deep wells. One brewer was Joseph Truman, first recorded in 1683. His family, particularly Benjamin Truman, went on to establish the sizeable Black Eagle Brewery on Brick Lane. The Brick Lane Market first developed in the 17th century for fruit and vegetables sold outside the City.

Successive waves of immigrants settled in the area. In the 17th century, French Huguenots expanded into the area for housing; the master weavers were based in Spitalfields. Starting with the Huguenots, the area became a centre for weaving, tailoring and the developing clothing industry. It continued to attract immigrants, who provided semi-skilled and unskilled labour.

19th-century markets and their modern use

In the 19th century, Irish people and Ashkenazi Jews immigrated to the area. Jewish immigration continued into the early 20th century.

The Sunday market, like those on Petticoat Lane and nearby Columbia Road, dates from a dispensation given by the government to the Jewish community in the 19th century. At the time, owing to the Christian observance of Sabbath, no Sunday markets were open. Located at the junction of Cheshire Street and Sclater Street, the market sells bric-a-brac as well as fruit, vegetables and many other items. In 2015 it was identified by police as the focal point of a trade in stolen bicycles and bicycle parts, many taken from people employed in the City of London who had used "cycle to work" schemes. Alongside seven arrests, the police also warned purchasers that buying bicycles or parts in deals "too good to be true" could make them guilty of handling stolen goods. Near the junction with Hanbury Street are two indoor markets; Upmarket and Backyard Market. The Brick Lane Farmers' Market opened in 2010, intended to be held every Sunday in nearby Bacon Street; it has now closed.

In the later 20th century, Bangladeshi Bengalis from Sylhet comprised the major group of immigrants and gradually predominated in the area. Many Bengali immigrants to Brick Lane were from the Greater Sylhet region of what became Bangladesh. These settlers helped shape Bangladeshi migration to Britain; many families from Beanibazar, though they spread around the london city Jagannathpur and Bishwanath tend to live in the Brick Lane area.

Religious groups
In 1742, La Neuve Eglise, a Huguenot chapel, was built on the corner of Brick Lane and Fournier Street. By 1809, it was used by missionaries as The Jews’ Chapel, where they promoted Christianity to the expanding Jewish population. It was adapted as a Methodist chapel in 1819 for Protestant residents. (John Wesley had preached his first "covenant sermon" at the nearby Black Eagle Street Chapel).

Reflecting the changing demographics of the area, in 1898, the building was consecrated as the Machzikei HaDath, or Spitalfields Great Synagogue. After decades of change in the area, with Jews moving out and Bangladeshis moving in, in 1976 it was adapted again as the London Jamme Masjid (Great London Mosque) to serve the expanding Bangladeshi community. The building is Grade II* listed.

Bengali settlement

In the 20th century the Brick Lane area was important in the second wave of development of Anglo-Indian cuisine, as families from countries such as Bangladesh (mainly the Greater Sylhet region) migrated to London to look for work. Some curry houses of Brick Lane do not sell alcoholic beverages, for most are owned by Muslims. According to EasyJet Traveller magazine, the top three curry houses on Brick Lane in 2021 are Aladin, Sheba and City Spice.

Bengalis in the United Kingdom settled in big cities with industrial employment. In London, many settled in the East End. For centuries the East End has been the first port of call for many immigrants working in the docks and shipping from Chittagong port in Bengal (the British Empire in India was founded and based in Bengal). Their regular stopover paved the way for food outlets to be opened; these catered at first for an all-male workforce, for family migration and settlement took place some decades later. Humble beginnings such as this gave rise to Brick Lane as the famous curry capital of the UK (alongside Birmingham's Balti Triangle).

Designed by Meena Thakor, the ornamental Brick Lane Arch was erected in 1997 near Osborn Street to mark the entrance to Brick Lane and to ‘Banglatown’. Like Brick Lane's lamp posts, the arch displays the red and green colours of the Bangladesh flag. Having contributed so significantly to the area, the Bengali community campaigned to get the arch installed to celebrate Bengali culture in Brick Lane.

Regeneration

More recently the area has also broadened to being a vibrant art and fashion student area, with considerable exhibition space. Each year most of the fine art and fashion courses exhibit their work near Brick Lane.

Since the late 1990s, Brick Lane has been the site of several of the city's best known night clubs, notably 93 Feet East and The Vibe Bar, both built on the site of The Old Truman Brewery, once the industrial centre of the area, and now an office and entertainment complex. In 1999, it was the scene of a bombing that injured 13 people.

Brick Lane has a regular display of graffiti, which features artists such as Banksy, Stik, ROA, D*Face, Ben Eine and Omar Hassan. The street has been used in many music videos, including "Glory Days" by Just Jack, "All These Things That I've Done" by The Killers, and "Überlin" by R.E.M.

Land ownership and naming

Large swathes of Brick Lane and its surrounding areas were once owned by the Osborne (later Osborn after 1720) family, Baronets, of Chicksands in the County of Bedford. The family's holdings survived until at least the 1970s. The family's history continues to be reflected by the naming of streets in the area around Brick Lane, including:
 Chicksand Street reflects the village of Chicksands in Bedfordshire, location of the family seat Chicksands Priory; 
 The west end of what is now Chicksand Street was once Osborn Place (see 1787 map);
 Modern Osborn Street is a renaming of what was once the southernmost stretch of Brick Lane (see Rocque map of 1746 for this naming, altered by the time of the 1787 map);
 Heneage Street reflects the marriage of George Osborn, 4th Baronet, to Lady Heneage Finch (his 2nd wife) in April 1772;
 The modern Hopetown Street was originally Finch Street, reflecting the same marriage (see 1853 map, right);
 The modern Old Montague Street was originally just Montague Street, preserving the maternal family name of George Osborn, 4th Baronet, whose mother, Mary Montague, was the daughter of George Montague, 2nd Earl of Halifax. The continuation of Chicksand Street to the east (now demolished) was once Halifax Street, referencing the same marriage.
 Modern Hanbury Street is made up of four streets shown on the 1853 map: Browns Lane, Montague Street (triggering the addition of 'Old' to the earlier street of the same name), Well Street and Church Street.

Buildings of interest
Nearby buildings of interest include Christ Church, Spitalfields, the Jamme Masjid or Great London Mosque on the corner of Fournier Street (the building represents a history of successive communities of immigrants in East End), and The Rag Factory on Heneage Street (once home to Turner Prize nominees Tracey Emin and Gary Hume, now a thriving arts space).

Transport

The nearest London Underground stations are Aldgate East and Liverpool Street. A campaign was launched in 2006 to change the name of Aldgate East station to "Brick Lane", but received no official support.

The nearest London Overground station is Shoreditch High Street station. This line runs on part of the former East London Line which has now been converted to London Overground. At the junction with Pedley Street existed the former Shoreditch Underground station terminus, which closed in 2006 due to the construction of the East London Line extension, and replaced by the aforementioned Shoreditch High Street. Remnants of the station can be seen from overground trains entering and leaving Liverpool Street station.

In popular culture 

The street is the location for Monica Ali's book Brick Lane, published in 2003, and the film of the same name of 2007 starring Tannishtha Chatterjee. The novel provoked a controversy with some of the local South Asian community because of a perceived negative portrayal of them. Parts of the Bengali community were particularly opposed to plans by Ruby Films to film parts of the movie based on the novel in the Brick Lane area and formed the "Campaign Against Monica Ali's Film Brick Lane". Consequently, the producers of the film used different locations for certain scenes, such as that depicting Brick Lane Market. Despite this, the director of the film, Sarah Gavron, attests on the DVD commentary of the film that genuine footage of Brick Lane does appear in the finished movie. Activists told The Guardian they intended to burn copies of Ali's book during a rally to be held on 30 July 2006, but the demonstration passed without incident.

Other notable books on the area are Salaam Brick Lane by Tarquin Hall, On Brick Lane (2007) by Rachel Lichtenstein and An Acre of Barren Ground by Jeremy Gavron. A large collection of photographs of the characters and salespeople who worked on the markets in Brick Lane were taken by Fran May between 1976 and 1978, whilst she was a student of photography at the Royal College of Art.

The street was used for several filming locations for the third season of the BBC television series Luther (2013).

See also
Beigel Bake
British Bangladeshi
Green Street, London
Balti Triangle, Birmingham, also known as 'The Halal Quarter'

References

External links

 Brick Lane entry at the Survey of London (1957)
 Brick Lane through the last two hundred years, including many genealogical pubs.
 Virtual e-Tour Brick Lane
 Our Brick Lane - Eastside Community Heritage

Restaurant districts and streets in England
Streets in the London Borough of Tower Hamlets
Ethnic enclaves in the United Kingdom
Bethnal Green
Shoreditch
Spitalfields
Whitechapel
District centres of London